State Highway 7 (SH-7) is a state highway in Clearwater County, Idaho, United Staters, running from the Lewis County line through Orofino.

Route description
SH-7 begins at the Clearwater-Lewis county line between Nezperce and Orofino.  At one time, SH-7 continued south on Russell Ridge Road, SH-62 into Nezperce, SH-162 (before it turns east towards Kamiah), and Old SH-7 to U.S. Highway 95 (US-95) west of Grangeville. SH-7 continues north, briefly overlapping US-12 before crossing the Clearwater River into Orofino.  It then runs through Orofino, continues north and ends on a bridge crossing the north fork of the Clearwater River.  The road continues as Old State Highway 7 and Clearwater County P1.

Major intersections

See also

 List of state highways in Idaho

References

External links

 Corco Highways - Idaho State Highway 7

007
Transportation in Clearwater County, Idaho